Bhan Saeedabad also known as Bhan is a small town near Sehwan Sharif, Jamshoro District, Sindh, Pakistan.

Bhan Sayed Abad south side is Sehwan Shareef and the north side is Dadu.

Bhan Syedabad is also town committee and it has 8 wards. The village Sayed Murad Ali Shah of present Chief Minister of Sindh, Pakistan is near Bhan Syedabad.
The Famous Saint Hazrat Syed Sulaiman Shah is buried in Bhan Saeedabad . Bhan Sayedabad is an economical and business hub of District Jamshoro

References

Populated places in Jamshoro District